Atherton High School is a public school in Burton, Michigan. Atherton Community School District is one of five public school districts serving Burton Genesee County in the U.S. state of Michigan and in the Genesee Intermediate School District. Atherton School District runs two schools: Atherton Junior/Senior High School and Atherton Elementary School. (Vern Van Y. Elementary School closed in 2013.). The total school district has about 1,025 Students. There are approximately 61 teachers that are employed there.

History
Atherton opened as a one-room log schoolhouse at Atherton and Center roads corner in 1836 within the then newly formed Flint Township, Michigan (later Township of Burton, now City of Burton) for the Atherton Settlement just founded a year before. The school district is named after the first teacher, Betsey Atherton, daughter of Adonijah Atherton—one of the town’s first settlers. Betsey died a few months later. The district in 1878 had funding of $1,832, 17 teachers and eight schoolhouses.

Four elementary schools eventual replaced the eight schoolhouses: Fisk, H.W. Medler, Metzger and Herbst. Those elementary schools operated until the late 1960s. Fisk was on Manor Drive and is currently a daycare. The remaining two, Metzger on Sitka Street and Herbst on Clarice Street, were demolished. Medler became the high school which graduated its first class in 1954. The current Atherton High School was built in 1965 next to Medler. Medler then became the middle school until 1969 when the middle school opened south of the high school. Medler then held sixth grade students only. Medler was hit by lightning in the early morning hours in the summer of 1977, causing the back half of the building to burn down. H.W. Medler was on Genesee Road and is currently a charter school.
On December 9, 2003, a consolidation vote for the three all Burton school districts took place with Atherton and Bentley voters in favor of consolidation and Bendle voters not in favor. In 2003, a plan of merger was accepted by the State Superintendent of Education between Atherton and Bentley School Districts, which subsequently failed at the election. The School District celebrated their 175th year in 2011, making the school about 1 year older than the State of Michigan itself.
In February 2013, a discussion arose among Board members about closing down Vern Van Y Elementary School. This is because of financial problems as well as decline in student count. Van Y was closed at the conclusion of the 2012-2013 school year.  Beginning in the 2013-2014 school year, the district operates as a two school district.  Atherton Elementary (formerly Atherton Junior High) houses grades K-6.  Atherton Junior/Senior High (formerly Atherton Senior High) houses grades 7-12.

Sports

Atherton High School is a class C school district.

Board of Education 
2017 Board Members

Steven Vowles is principal Atherton Junior/Senior High.
Susanne Carpenter is principal of Atherton Elementary School.

References

School districts in Michigan
Education in Genesee County, Michigan
Educational institutions established in 1836
1836 establishments in Michigan Territory